The second treaty of Durham was a peace treaty concluded between kings Stephen of England and David I of Scotland,  on 9 April 1139.

On 22 August 1138, the Scottish army under the command of David I had been defeated at the Battle of the Standard. But in the spring of 1139, Stephen was to face another problem when Empress Matilda, decided to retake the crown of England usurped by Stephen after the death of Henry I of England, landed in England. 

This marked the beginning of the English civil war known as The Anarchy. Stephen, not wishing to face several forces at once had to make concessions with the Scottish king. David's son Henry was given the earldom of Northumberland which included Carlisle, Cumberland, Westmorland and Lancashire to the north of Ribble, except the castles of Bamburgh and Newcastle. Moreover, Stephen recognised the independence of Scotland. David I, via his son Henry, now controlled an English territory which stretched to the Tees.

Sources
Howlett, Richard (ed.): "The Cronicles of Richard, Prior of Hexham" (Chronicles of the Regin of Stephan, Henry II., and Richard I, vol. 3, p. 2) London (1964), pp. 
177-178

See also
 England and King David I
 Treaty of Durham (1136)

References

1139
1130s in England
1139 in Scotland
1139 in England
Durham (1139)
Durham (1139)
History of Durham, England
12th-century treaties
England–Scotland relations
Treaties of medieval England